Qian Yumiao (born 7 February 1998) is a Chinese footballer who currently plays for Chinese Super League side Tianjin TEDA.

Club career
Qian Yumiao joined Wuhan Zall's youth academy in 2013. In August 2016, he had a brief trial with Eredivisie side SC Heerenveen along with Yang Chaohui. Failing to pass the trial, they moved to Portugal and joined Vizela's U19s in September 2016. Qian transferred to Chinese Super League side Tianjin Quanjian in July 2017. On 29 October 2017, he made his senior debut in a 4–1 home win against Liaoning FC, coming on for Zhang Cheng in the 73rd minute when Tianjin was leading 4–1.

Career statistics
.

References

External links
 

1998 births
Living people
Chinese footballers
People from Jingmen
Footballers from Hubei
Tianjin Tianhai F.C. players
Tianjin Jinmen Tiger F.C. players
Chinese Super League players
Association football midfielders